Elvis' Golden Records Volume 3 is a greatest hits album by American rock and roll singer Elvis Presley, released by RCA Victor as LPM/LSP-2765 on August 11, 1963. The album was the third volume of an eventual five volume collection, and his eighteenth altogether. It is a compilation of hit singles released in 1960, 1961, and 1962.

The album was originally released as a mono and stereo LP record and was reissued several times on compact disc. It peaked at number three on the Billboard Top Pop Albums chart. The album was certified Gold on November 1, 1966, and Platinum on March 27, 1992, by the Recording Industry Association of America.

Background 
Presley's manager, Colonel Tom Parker, envisioned a marketing strategy of alternating soundtrack albums with independent studio recordings, accompanied by singles. By mid-1963, Presley's studio albums had struggled while the soundtrack albums had all done brisk business. Sessions in late May had failed to produce material cohesive enough for a regular album, those tracks surfacing on singles and pell-mell on soundtracks and the Elvis for Everyone compilation. The immediate solution was another compilation of hit singles, the sales numbers proving the success of this interim strategy.

Content 
Golden Records Volume 3 comprises eight Top Five A-sides along with four b-sides which also made the Top 40, "Fame and Fortune", "I Gotta Know", "Little Sister", and "Anything That's Part of You". Five A-Sides, "Stuck on You", "It's Now or Never", "Are You Lonesome Tonight?", "Surrender", and "Good Luck Charm" went to #1.  "It's Now or Never" had been adapted from the 1898 Neapolitan song "O Sole Mio," and "Are You Lonesome Tonight", a ballad from 1926, had been a rare request from Parker to Presley for Parker's wife. As with the other titles in the series, all singles in this compilation are certified by the RIAA as attaining gold status with sales of at least 500,000 copies.

Original recordings produced by Steve Sholes, Joseph Lilley, Chet Atkins, Urban Thielmann, Jeff Alexander, and Hans J. Salter.

Reissues
RCA first issued the original 12-track album on compact disc in 1989. The second CD reissue in 1997 added six bonus tracks, those being two album tracks, two songs originally issued on EP singles, another b-side, and the number two hit single "Can't Help Falling In Love" from the soundtrack to Blue Hawaii. "The Girl of My Best Friend" was taken from the album Elvis Is Back!, and "Wooden Heart" from the soundtrack to G.I. Blues.  "Wooden Heart" would be reissued as a b-side twice, once in 1964 and again in 1965, and the b-side "Wild in the Country" is the title track to the film of the same name.  The remaining pair of film songs, "Follow That Dream" and "King of the Whole Wide World", are respectively from the EP soundtracks to the Presley movies Follow That Dream and Kid Galahad. RCA later reissued the album on CD again with the bonus tracks removed and the original running order restored.

Track listing 
Chart positions for singles taken from Billboard Pop Singles chart where noted.

Original release

1997 Reissue bonus tracks

Personnel 

 Elvis Presley – vocals, acoustic guitar
 Scotty Moore – rhythm guitar, lead guitar on "Stuck on You" and "Fame and Fortune"
 Hank Garland – lead guitar, bass on "Stuck on You," "Fame and Fortune," and "(Marie's the Name) His Latest Flame"
 Tiny Timbrell – guitar on "Wooden Heart", "King of the Whole World," "Wild in the Country"
 Neal Matthews – lead guitar on "(Marie's the Name) His Latest Flame," rhythm guitar on "King of the Whole Wide World"
 Harold Bradley – guitar on "She's Not You," six-string bass on "Little Sister"
 Jerry Kennedy – lead guitar on "Good Luck Charm" and "Anything That's Part of You"
 Grady Martin – guitar or vibraphone on "She's Not You"
 Floyd Cramer – piano, organ
 Gordon Stoker – piano
 Dudley Brooks – piano on "Wild in the Country"
 Bob Moore – double bass
 Ray Siegel – double bass on "Wooden Heart"
 Meyer Rubin – double bass on "Wild in the Country"
 D.J. Fontana – drums
 Buddy Harman – drums
 Hal Blaine – drums
 Boots Randolph – saxophone, vibraphone
 Jimmie Haskell – accordion on "Wild in the Country"
 The Jordanaires – backing vocals
 Millie Kirkham – backing vocals

Charts and certifications

Album

Certifications

References

External links
 

Albums produced by Steve Sholes
Elvis Presley compilation albums
1963 greatest hits albums
RCA Victor compilation albums